Limnobacter thiooxidans is a Gram-negative, thiosulfate-oxidizing bacterium with a single polar flagellum, from the genus Limnobacter and family Burkholderiaceae, isolated from sediment of the littoral zone from the Chiemsee in Germany.

References

External links
Type strain of Limnobacter thiooxidans at BacDive -  the Bacterial Diversity Metadatabase

Burkholderiaceae